is a passenger railway station in located in the city of  Fukuchiyama, Kyoto Prefecture, Japan, operated by the private railway company Willer Trains (Kyoto Tango Railway).

Lines

Station layout
The station consists of one ground-level island platform connected to the station building by an underground passage. The station is staffed.

Adjacent stations

History
The station was opened on 16 July 1988.

Passenger statistics
In fiscal 2018, the station was used by an average of 79 passengers daily.

Surrounding area
Onigawara Park
Fukuchiyama City Chamber of Commerce
Fukuchiyama Municipal Hospital Oe Branch
Fukuchiyama City Hall Oe Branch

See also
List of railway stations in Japan

References

External links

home page 

Railway stations in Kyoto Prefecture
Railway stations in Japan opened in 1988
Fukuchiyama, Kyoto